The Great Fire of Rome occurred in July AD 64. The fire began in the merchant shops around Rome's chariot stadium, Circus Maximus, on the night of 19 July. After six days, the fire was brought under control, but before the damage could be assessed, the fire reignited and burned for another three days. In the aftermath of the fire, two thirds of Rome had been destroyed.

According to Tacitus and later Christian tradition, Emperor Nero blamed the devastation on the Christian community in the city, initiating the empire's first persecution against the Christians.

Background

Previous recorded fires in Rome 
Fires in Rome were common, especially in houses, and fires that had occurred previously in Rome and destroyed parts of major buildings include:
 AD 6, which led to the introduction of the Cohortes Vigiles
 AD 12 which destroyed the Basilica Julia
 AD 14 at the Basilica Aemilia
 AD 22 at the Campus Martius
 AD 26 at Caelian Hill
 AD 36 at the Circus Maximus

Nero 
Nero was proclaimed Roman emperor in AD 54 at the age of 17. His rule has commonly been associated with impulsiveness and tyranny. Early in his reign, he was heavily advised, but he slowly became more independent. In 59 AD, encouraged by his mistress Poppaea, Nero murdered his mother Agrippina. His leading adviser, Seneca, was discharged and forced to commit suicide. After the Great Fire of Rome occurred in July 64 AD, it was rumored that Nero had ordered the fire to clear space for a new palace, the Domus Aurea. At the time of the fire Nero may not have been in the city but 35 miles away at his villa in Antium, and possibly returned to the city before the fire was out.

Tacitus 
Publius Cornelius Tacitus was a senator and historian of the Roman Empire. His exact birth date is unknown, but most sources place it in either AD 56 or 57. His two main works, the Annals and the Histories, covered the history of the empire between AD 14 and AD 96. However, much of the work has been lost, including the books covering events after AD 70. Tacitus was only eight years old at the time of the fire, but he was able to use public records and reports to write an accurate account.

Vigiles 
After the fire in AD 6, the Vigiles ("cohorts of the watchmen") were introduced by Augustus. The cohortes vigilum, run by freedmen, were tasked with guarding Rome at night while the cohortes urbanae were tasked with guarding Rome during the day. By the time of the Great Fire of Rome, there were thousands of Vigiles in the city, and they went to work trying to stop the flames by pouring buckets of water into buildings, trying to move flammable material from the fire's path, and even demolishing buildings to attempt to make a fire break. In 22 BC, Augustus funded a fire brigade.

Rome's water system 
Before the fire, Rome's water was brought in by nine aqueducts, which were not set up with equipment to fight fires. Carrying out repairs to the aqueducts was an ongoing task for the Curator Aquarum or Water Commissioner of Rome. The Curator Aquarum was also in charge of investigations into those who were illegally piping water away without paying a license fee to the state. Firefighters relied on blankets, buckets of water, vinegar, and demolition of buildings to put fires out.

Outbreak and progress of fire
According to Tacitus, the fire began in shops where flammable goods were stored, in the region of the Circus neighboring the Caelian and Palatine Hills of Rome. The night was a windy one and the flames rapidly spread along the full length of the Circus. The fire expanded through an area of narrow, twisting streets and closely located apartment blocks. In this lower area of ancient Rome, there were no large buildings such as temples, or open areas of ground, to impede the conflagration. It then spread along the Palatine and Caelian slopes. The population fled first to areas unaffected by the fire and then to the open fields and rural roads outside the city. Looters and arsonists were reported to have spread the flames by throwing torches or, acting in groups, hindering measures being made to halt or slow the progress of the flames. Some groups responsible for throwing torches and stopping those from fighting the fire were reported to have claimed they were under orders to do so. The fire stopped after six days of continuous burning. However, it soon reignited and burned for another three days.

Tests into how fires spread have shown that large fires are able to create their own wind and this, combined with embers being blown to new buildings, could have caused the fire to spread further and could account for witnesses claiming that random fires started in houses that were away from the flames. As well as wind playing a factor in fire spread, those who had claimed to be under orders to stop people from fighting the fires never named the one who ordered them and they were also reported to have looted buildings.

Aftermath 

According to Tacitus, Nero was away from Rome, in Antium, when the fire broke out. Nero returned to the city and took measures to bring in food supplies and to open gardens and public buildings to accommodate refugees. Of Rome's fourteen districts, three were completely devastated, seven more were reduced to a few scorched and mangled ruins and only four completely escaped damage. The Temple of Jupiter Stator, the House of the Vestals, and Nero's palace, the Domus Transitoria were damaged or destroyed. Also destroyed in the fire was the portion of the Forum where the Roman senators lived and worked. However, the open space in the middle of the Forum remained a shopping/meeting centre. The accusations of Nero having started the fire were further exacerbated by his quickness to rebuild burned neighbourhoods in the Greek style and to launch construction of his new palace.

For the city's reconstruction, Nero dictated new and far-sighted building rules, intended to curb the excesses of speculation  and trace a new urban plan, which still can be discerned from the city layout today. He rebuilt much of the destroyed area, and had the ostentatious building complex known as Domus Aurea (Golden House) built, his personal residence (replacing the Domus Transitoria and including an extension of about 2.5 km2), which came to include the Palatine, the slopes of the Esquiline (Opium) and part of the Celio. This may not have been a possible motive for the fire, as he could have requisitioned the necessary land anyway, and most was already in his possession.

To find the necessary funds for the reconstruction, Nero's government increased taxation. In particular heavy tributes were imposed on the provinces of the empire. To meet at least a proportion of the costs, Nero devalued the Roman currency, increasing inflationary pressure for the first time in the Empire's history.

Debris from the fire was used as fill for the nearby malaria-infested marshes.

Varying historical accounts

The varying historical accounts of the event come from three secondary sources—Cassius Dio, Suetonius, and Tacitus. The primary accounts, which possibly included histories written by Fabius Rusticus, Marcus Cluvius Rufus, and Pliny the Elder, do not survive. At least six separate stories circulate regarding Nero and the fire:
 Motivated by a desire to destroy the city, Nero secretly sent out men pretending to be drunk to set fire to the city. Nero watched from his palace on the Palatine Hill singing and playing the lyre.
 Nero quite openly sent out men to set fire to the city. Nero watched from the Tower of Maecenas on the Esquiline Hill singing.
 Nero sent out men to set fire to the city. There were unconfirmed rumors that Nero sang from a private stage during the fire.
 Nero was motivated to destroy the city so he would be able to bypass the senate and rebuild Rome in his image.
 Rumor had it that Nero had started the fire. Therefore, to blame someone else for it (and thus exonerate Nero from blame), the fire was said to have been caused by the already unpopular Christians.
 The fire was an accident that occurred while Nero was in Antium.

See also
 List of fires
 List of town and city fires

References

Bibliography
 Cassius Dio, Roman History, Books 62 (c. 229)
 Suetonius, The Lives of Twelve Caesars, the Life of Nero, 38 (c. 121)
 Tacitus, Annals, XV (c. 117)

Further reading
 James Romm, "Who started it?" (review of Anthony Barrett, Rome Is Burning, Princeton, December 2020, 447 pp.), London Review of Books, vol. 43, no. 12 (17 June 2021), pp. 21–22.

External links

 Tacitus describes the great Fire 

64
60s in the Roman Empire
1st-century disasters
Ancient city of Rome
Fires in Italy
Nero
1st-century Christianity
1st century in Italy
Urban fires in Europe